Bašibos is a village in the municipality of Valandovo, North Macedonia. It is located close to the Greek border.

Demographics
As of the 2021 census, Bašibos had 110 residents with the following ethnic composition:
Turks 103
Persons for whom data are taken from administrative sources 7

According to the 2002 census, the village had a total of 170 inhabitants. Ethnic groups in the village include:
Turks 169
Others 1

References

External links

Villages in Valandovo Municipality